Mark Buckley (born 1998) is an Irish Gaelic footballer who plays at club level with Dohenys and at inter-county level with the Cork senior football team. He usually lines out as a forward.

Career

Buckley first played competitive Gaelic football with the Dohenys club in Dunmanway. After divisional success in the under-21 grade, he eventually progressed onto the club's senior team. Buckley first appeared on the inter-county scene as a member of the Cork minor football team in 2016 before later lining out with the under-20 side. He 
first appeared on the inter-county scene when he was selected for the Cork senior football team for the pre-season McGrath Cup competition in 2022. Buckley later earned inclusion on the team's National League panel.

Career statistics

Club

Inter-county

Honours

Dohenys
West Cork Under-21A Football Championship: 2017

References

1998 births
Living people
CIT Gaelic footballers
Dohenys Gaelic footballers
Cork inter-county Gaelic footballers
People from Dunmanway